The 1980 United States presidential election in Virginia took place on November 4, 1980. All 50 states and the District of Columbia, were part of the 1980 United States presidential election. Virginia voters chose 12 electors to the Electoral College, which selected the president and vice president of the United States.

Virginia was won by former California Governor Ronald Reagan with 53.03% of the vote, who was running against incumbent United States President Jimmy Carter of Georgia and Representative John B. Anderson of Illinois. The national election was ultimately won by Reagan with 50.75% of the vote.

, this is the last occasion when Franklin County, Isle of Wight County, Craig County, Louisa County and Pulaski County have voted for a Democratic presidential candidate. It is also the last time Arlington County and Alexandria City have voted for a Republican presidential candidate.

Results

Results by county

References

Virginia
1980
1980 Virginia elections